The William S. Campbell House is a property in Franklin, Tennessee that is listed on the National Register of Historic Places. It was added to the list in 1975. A private residence, it is also known as Magnolia Hall and was built in 1840. It is part of the Boyd Mill Avenue Historic District. William S. Campbell was born in Ireland, and opened a national bank in the area after the American Civil War.

The house is of Italianate architecture, and has a cupola and a widow's walk. When listed the property included four contributing buildings.

It is located on TN 96 west of the downtown area.

References

Houses on the National Register of Historic Places in Tennessee
Houses in Franklin, Tennessee
Italianate architecture in Tennessee
Houses completed in 1840
National Register of Historic Places in Williamson County, Tennessee